The following outline is provided as an overview of and topical guide to ancient China:

Ancient China – China under the rule of the Xia, Shang, and Zhou dynasties, beginning around 2070 B.C. and extending until approximately 256 B.C.

Geography of ancient China

Locations in ancient China 
 List of Bronze Age sites in China

Regions of ancient China 
 Regions of ancient China during the Xia and Shang dynasties
 Nine Provinces
 Ji Province
 Jing Province
 Liang Province
 Qing Province
 Xu Province
 Yan Province
 Yang Province
 Yong Province
 Yu Province

Government and politics of ancient China 
 Political thought in ancient China
 Mandate of Heaven
 Ancient Chinese states
 Interstate relations during the Spring and Autumn period
 Family tree of ancient Chinese emperors
 Aristocracy in ancient China (nobility)

Rulers in ancient China 
 Kings of the Xia dynasty
 Yu the Great
 Qi
 Tai Kang
 Zhong Kang
 Xiang
 Shao Kang
 Zhu
 Huai
 Mang
 Xie
 Bu Jiang
 Jiong
 Jin
 Kong Jia
 Gao
 Fa
 Jie
 Kings of the Shang Dynasty
 Early Shang period
 Da Yi
 Da Ding
 Da Jia
 Bu Bing
 Da Geng
 Xiao Jia
 Da Wu
 Lü Ji
 Zhong Ding
 Bu Ren
 Jian Jia
 Zu Yi
 Zu Xin
 Qiang Jia
 Zu Ding
 Nan Geng
 Xiang Jia
 Yin period
 Pan Geng
 Xiao Xin
 Xiao Yi
 Wu Ding
 Zu Geng
 Zu Jia
 Lin Xin
 Kang Ding
 Wu Yi
 Wen Wu Ding
 Di Yi
 Di Xin

Ancient Chinese law 
 Traditional Chinese law

Military history of ancient China

Military of ancient China 
 Ancient Chinese armor
 Crossbow
 Military thought
 During the Zhou Dynasty
 Six Secret Teachings – attributed to Lü Shang (aka Jiang Ziya), a top general of King Wen of Zhou, founder of the Zhou dynasty
 During Warring States period – great period for military strategy; of the Seven Military Classics of China, four were written during this period:
 The Art of War – attributed to Sun Tzu, a highly influential study of strategy and tactics.
 Wuzi – attributed to Wu Qi, a statesman and commander who served the states of Wei and then Chu.
 Wei Liaozi – of uncertain authorship.
 The Methods of the Sima – attributed to Sima Rangju, a commander serving the state of Qin.

General history of ancient China

Ancient Chinese history, by period 

History of ancient China
 Neolithic China (c. 8500 – c. 2070 BC) – predates ancient China
 Bronze Age China
 Xia dynasty (c. 2070 – c. 1600 BC)
 Shang dynasty (c. 1600 – c. 1046 BC)
 Zhou dynasty (c. 1046 – 256 BC|BCE)
 Western Zhou (1046–771 BC)
 Iron Age China
 Zhou dynasty (continued)
 Eastern Zhou
 Spring and Autumn period (771 – 476 BC)
 Warring States period (475 – 221 BC)

Ancient Chinese history, by region 
 See also Regions of ancient China, above
 Ancient history of Beijing
 Ancient history of Shanghai
 Ye

 Ancient Chinese history, by subject 

 See the rest of this outline Works on ancient Chinese history 
 Records of the Grand Historian The Cambridge History of Ancient China Twenty-Four Histories''

Culture of ancient China 
 Architecture in ancient China
 Ancient Chinese wooden architecture
 Dogs in ancient China
 Games in ancient China
 Chuiwan
 Cuju
 Go
 Liubo
 Mythology of China
 Chinese creation myth
 Chinese dragon
 Ancient Chinese urban planning
 Women in ancient and imperial China

Art in ancient China

Performing arts in ancient China 
 Juggling in ancient China
 Music in ancient China
 Yayue

Language in ancient China 
 Old Chinese or Archaic Chinese
 Classical Chinese or Literary Chinese
 History of names in ancient China
 History of Chinese personal names
 History of Chinese surnames in ancient China
 Origin of Chinese surnames
 Eight Great Surnames of Chinese Antiquity
 Evolution of written Chinese
 Oracle bone script – earliest confirmed evidence of the Chinese script yet discovered is the body of inscriptions carved on oracle bones from the late Shang dynasty (c. 1200–1050 BC).
 Chinese bronze inscriptions
 Seal script

Literature in ancient China 
 Ancient Chinese classics

People in ancient China 
 Ancient Chinese philosophers
 Family tree of ancient Chinese emperors

Philosophy in ancient China 

Ancient Chinese philosophy
 Hundred Schools of Thought
 School of Names
 Ancient Chinese philosophers

Economics and infrastructure of ancient China 
 Economic history of ancient China
 Coinage in ancient China

Science and technology of ancient China 
 Chariots in ancient China
 Xi Zhong
 Bamboo and wooden slips
 Crossbow

See also 

 Outline of ancient history
 Outline of ancient Egypt
 Outline of ancient Greece
 Outline of ancient India
 Outline of ancient Rome
 Early Imperial period
 Qin dynasty (221-206 BC)
 Han dynasty (206 BC - 220 CE)
 End of the Han dynasty (189 - 220 CE)

References

External links 

 Ancient China's Geography
 Ancient China | Map, Timeline, & History - at TS Historical

 
Outlines of geography and places
Ancient China